Kilmactrany (some sources Kilmactranny) is a civil parish in the Barony of Tireragh in County Sligo, in the province of Connacht in Ireland. It has an area of 2643 hectares and a church,

References 

Civil parishes of County Sligo